J. Harleston Parker (1873 - May 5, 1930) was an American architect active in Boston, Massachusetts.

Parker was born in Boston, graduated from Harvard University in 1893, then studied architecture at the Massachusetts Institute of Technology and, after a further four years at the École des Beaux-Arts in Paris, took his degree in 1899. In 1900, he formed the firm of Parker & Thomas in Boston with Douglas H. Thomas, Jr., which later in 1907 added Arthur Wallace Rice to become Parker, Thomas & Rice. As head of the firm, he designed many notable buildings and served as chairman of the Boston Art Commission.

In 1921, he established the "Harleston Parker Medal" in memory of his father, awarded annually by the Boston Society of Architects and City of Boston to recognize "such architects as shall have, in the opinion of the Boston Society of Architects for any private citizen, association, corporation, or public authority, the most beautiful piece of architecture, building, monument or structure within the limits of the City of Boston or of the Metropolitan Parks District".

Selected works 

A number of their works are listed on the U.S. National Register of Historic Places, maintained by the National Park Service of the U.S. Department of the Interior.

Works include:

As Parker & Thomas
Alex Brown Building (1901), 135 East Baltimore Street at North Calvert Street, (southwest corner), Baltimore, Maryland, (Parker & Thomas), NRHP-listed
Belvedere Hotel (1903), 1 East Chase Street off North Charles Street, Baltimore, Maryland, (Parker & Thomas), NRHP-listed
Tennis and Racquet Club, (1904), Boston, Massachusetts. (Parker & Thomas)
Baltimore & Ohio Railroad Building (1904-1906), 2 North Charles Street at West Baltimore Street, (northwest corner), Baltimore, Maryland, (Parker & Thomas), with Herbert D. Hale and Henry G. Morse. Now the Hotel Monaco Baltimore.
Stone House Hill House (1905), mansion of Frederick Lothrop Ames, Jr., later part of Stonehill College 
Rosenfeld Building, (1905), 32-42 South Paca Street, Baltimore, Maryland, (Parker & Thomas), NRHP-listed
Fenway Studios (1905-1906), 30 Ipswich Street, Boston, Massachusetts, (Parker & Thomas), NRHP-listed
Finney Houses Historic District (1906), Glenville Road. near junction with MD 155, near  Churchville, Maryland in Harford County, (Parker & Thomas), NRHP-listed
World Relief Headquarters (1907), (former Savings Bank of Baltimore Building, founded 1818), East Baltimore Street at North Charles Street, (southeast corner), Baltimore, Maryland. (Parker & Thomas)
U.S. Post Office and Courthouse, (1905-1907), 9th Street and 5th Avenue, Huntington, West Virginia, (Parker & Thomas), NRHP-listed
 Maryland Casualty Building, of the Maryland Casualty Company, (1912), (also known as "The Tower Building" with landmark rooftip clock), 400 block East Baltimore Street at Holliday Street, (northwest corner), Baltimore, Maryland, razed early 1980s, a parking lot still exists.

As Parker, Thomas & Rice
R. H. Stearns Building, (1908-1909), 140 Tremont Street, Boston, Massachusetts, (Parker,Thomas & Rice), NRHP-listed
Baltimore Gas and Electric Company Building (1916), of old Consolidated Gas, Electric Light and Power Company, (later renamed Baltimore Gas and Electric Company - founded 1816), 39 West Lexington Street, at North Liberty/Sharp Street/Hopkins Place, (northeast corner), Baltimore, Maryland, (Parker, Thomas and Rice), NRHP-listed
John Hancock Building, (1922), The Stephen L. Brown Building, 197 Clarendon Street, Boston, Massachusetts,  (Parker, Thomas and Rice)
United Shoe Machinery Corporation Building, (1929), 138-164 Federal Street, Boston, Massachusetts, (Parker,Thomas & Rice), NRHP-listed

References 

 
 Society of Architectural Historians
 The Architectural Record, Volume 46, December 1919, American Institute of Architects, pages 499-517.
 The Architectural Forum, Volume 36, 1922, page 42.

Architects from Boston
1873 births
1930 deaths
American alumni of the École des Beaux-Arts
Harvard University alumni
MIT School of Architecture and Planning alumni